William John Millican (April 24, 1904 – November 13, 1944) was a decorated submarine commander in the United States Navy during World War II.

Early life
Millican was born in 1904 to William J. Millican Sr. and Ellen Theresa Millican (née O’Shea) in Brooklyn, New York. His father was a Boston native and his mother was in Irish immigrant from New Ross, Wexford County, Ireland. Millican spent his first years in Brooklyn, attending Public School 153 and St. Brendan's parochial school. Around 1915 the Millican family moved to Norwalk, Connecticut, north of New York City.

Millican received his appointment from Connecticut to The United States Naval Academy in Annapolis, Maryland, on June 17, 1924. This was the first class to enter under the reduced appointee law following the Washington Naval Conference, designed to reduce the size of the navies of United States, Japan, China, France, Britain, Italy, Belgium, Netherlands, and Portugal. Millican was very active in sports at the naval academy. He was an Annapolis all-time letterwinner in the 1925 and 1926 football seasons. Millican, quarterback, was well known for his speed on the field, allowing him to play in two Army–Navy Games. Besides football, he played baseball, and was also an active boxer. Millican graduated from Annapolis on June 7, 1928, and was commissioned as an ensign in the United States Navy.

Junior officer
In January 1932, Millican reported to the Submarine Base at New London, Connecticut, for a course on submarine instruction.

On June 27, Millican was detached from the S-15 and returned to Annapolis to become qualified to command submarines. In 1936, while taking an engineering course at the Postgraduate School in Annapolis, Millican was promoted to lieutenant. On June 2, 1936, Millican married Sara Elizabeth Stevens at the U.S. Naval Academy Chapel. In March 1937 the Millicans had a daughter, Sandra. In 1938, Millican completed a chemical warfare course at Washington Navy Yard.

World War II
After the attack on Pearl Harbor, the S-18 departed her base Bremerton on January 12, 1942, to patrol the Aleutian Islands on her first war patrol. Millican conducted a second and third war patrol in command of the S-18. However, all three war patrols were uneventful, and no enemy vessels were sighted. After the completion of the third war patrol on March 27, 1942, LCDR James H. Newsome took command of the S-18.

On June 26, 1942, the USS Thresher, under command of Millican, commenced her fourth war patrol, patrolling the waters between the Palau and the Marshall Islands. On 6 July, Millican received the chance he didn't have on his first three war patrols: an enemy tanker was sighted entering the channel to the Maloelap Atoll. Millican fired two stern shots, one struck the stern, the ship was beached or began to slowly sink. Afterward, the USS Thresher was attacked by aircraft, but without any damage.

On July 9, 1942, the USS Thresher was near the Kwajalein Atoll when it identified a destroyer tender, the Shinsho Maru. Millican fired two torpedoes, both scoring a hit causing the ship to explode. The anti-submarine response was intense, the Japanese responded with aerial bombing, depth charges, and grappling hooks. The USS Thresher was heavily depth charged, some even landing directly on the deck of the boat and rolling off. The damage from the depth charges caused an air leak revealing its location and making the Thresher easily targeted. The USS Thresher was caught by a large grappling hook, but was able to maneuver itself free and slip away. This incident was dramatized in the 1957 TV series, The Silent Service, titled "The End of the Line." The Millican had some other enemy encounters before ending the USS Thresher war patrol at Fremantle, Australia, as the Thresher had been assigned to the Southwest Pacific Submarine Forces. On 15 September 1942 Millican was given the temporary rank of commander.

Millican conducted two more war patrols in command of the USS Thresher, ending his sixth war patrol on March 10, 1943. On February 4, 1943, Millican was awarded his first Navy Cross for his actions commanding the USS Thresher on her fourth and fifth war patrols. On his sixth war patrol, Millican was credited with sinking 26,000 tons of enemy shipping and damaging an additional 11,000 tons. Millican was awarded a golden star in lieu of a second Navy Cross for his success in the USS Thresher sixth war patrol.

On 2 June 1944 Millican took command of the newly commissioned . On September 18, 1944, the USS Escolar finished training based at Pearl Harbor and put out to sea on her first war patrol. Her last communication was with Perth on October 17; she was never heard from again. Since Japanese records consulted after the war show no antisubmarine action at that time in the area where Escolar is believed to have been, it is assumed that she struck a mine and sank with all hands.

Memory
Millican Field, a baseball field at Hickam Air Force Base, was named in his honor. On April 16, 1952, a plaque at the field was presented by Admiral Charles Momsen, the inventor of the Momsen lung. While Millican's body was never recovered, he is listed on a memorial in the Manila American Cemetery and Memorial, in the Philippines.

Awards

References

1904 births
1944 deaths
United States Navy personnel killed in World War II
United States Navy officers
Recipients of the Navy Cross (United States)
United States Naval Academy alumni
United States submarine commanders
People from Brooklyn